Umê (variant spellings include ume, u-me) is a semi-formal script used to write the Tibetan alphabet used for both calligraphy and shorthand. The name ume means "headless" and refers to its distinctive feature: the absence of the horizontal guide line ('head') across the top of the letters. Between syllables, the tseg mark often appears as a vertical stroke, rather than the shorter 'dot'-like mark in some other scripts. There are two main kinds of umê writing:

Drutsa, used for writing documents.
Bêtsug, used for writing scriptures.

Other Tibetan scripts include the upright block form, uchen and the everyday, handwritten cursive, gyug yig. The name of the block form, uchen means "with a head", corresponding to the presence of the horizontal guide line.

See also
Tibetan script
Uchen script
Tibetan calligraphy

Tibetan script